

Friedrich Karst (4 September 1893 – 18 October 1975) was a general in the Wehrmacht of Nazi Germany during World War II who commanded several divisions. He was a recipient of the Knight's Cross of the Iron Cross.

Awards and decorations

 Knight's Cross of the Iron Cross on 28 August 1942 as Oberst and commander of Infanterie-Regiment 461

References

Citations

Bibliography

 

1893 births
1975 deaths
People from Iława
People from West Prussia
Lieutenant generals of the German Army (Wehrmacht)
German Army personnel of World War I
Prussian Army personnel
Recipients of the clasp to the Iron Cross, 1st class
Recipients of the Gold German Cross
Recipients of the Knight's Cross of the Iron Cross
German prisoners of war in World War II held by the United Kingdom
Reichswehr personnel
German Army generals of World War II